Tylophora is a former genus of climbing plants or vines, first described as a genus in 1810. The genus was originally erected by Robert Brown for four species he described in Australia. It was synonymized with Vincetoxicum in 2018, a decision accepted by Plants of the World Online .

Former species
Species have been moved to other genera, mainly Vincetoxicum, but also Gongronema, Heterostemma, Lygisma, Sarcolobus, Secamone, Streptocaulon and Wattakaka. Former species include:

References

Asclepiadoideae
Taxonomy articles created by Polbot
Historically recognized angiosperm genera